The , also rendered as Asai, was a Japanese clan during the Sengoku period.

History
The Azai was a line of daimyōs (feudal lords) seated at Odani Castle in northeastern Ōmi Province, located within present day Nagahama, Shiga Prefecture. The Azai originated in the early 1500s and claimed descent from the Hokke branch of the Fujiwara, a powerful clan in Japan from the Heian period to the Kamakura period. Initially, the clan were vassals of the Kyōgoku, but gradually emerged as independent daimyōs in northern Ōmi. However, Azai domains were soon conquered by the Rokkaku and the clan was forced into becoming their vassals. Azai Nagamasa became head of the clan in 1560 and successfully fought against the Rokkaku and Saitō Tatsuoki for independence by 1564. The Azai were long-time allies with the Asakura clan of Echizen Province who had assisted the clan in securing their independence. In 1570, Nagamasa joined the Asakura in their opposition to Oda Nobunaga, his brother-in-law and ally, to honour their alliance. The Azai were defeated by Nobunaga at the Battle of Anegawa in 1570, and all but eliminated when Nobunaga conquered Odani Castle and Nagamasa committed seppuku in 1573.

Order of succession
Azai Sukemasa – son of Azai Naotane, established Odani Castle in 1516
Azai Hisamasa – son of Sukemasa, was defeated by the Sasaki clan
Azai Nagamasa – son of Hisamasa, came into conflict with Oda Nobunaga and opposed him, entering an alliance with the Asakura clan and the monks of Mt. Hiei; he was defeated and forced to suicide by Nobunaga in 1573. He was married to Nobunaga's sister Oichi. His daughters included Yodo-dono (second wife of Toyotomi Hideyoshi and mother of Toyotomi Hideyori). Also Oeyo (wife of Tokugawa Hidetada and  mother of the third Tokugawa shōgun Iemitsu)

Prominent vassals
 Akao Kiyotsuna
 Isono Kazumasa
 Kaihō Tsunachika
 Amenomori Kiyosada
 Tōdō Takatora

References

Further reading
 Turnbull, Stephen. (1998). The Samurai Sourcebook. London: Cassell & Co.
 __. (2002). War in Japan: 1467–1615. Oxford: Osprey Publishing.

Azai clan
Fujiwara clan